Serhiy Lishchuk (alternate spelling: Sergei Lishouk) (born March 31, 1982) is a Ukrainian retired basketball player. Lishchuk played 18 seasons as a professional player in Ukraine and Spain.

Professional career

Europe
Lishchuk began his professional career in his native Ukraine. On September 2, 2009, he signed with the Spanish club València Bàsket. With Valencia, he won the 2nd-tier level European-wide league, the EuroCup, during both the 2009–10 season and the 2013–14 season. He left Valencia on June 22, 2015. On July 23, 2015, he signed with the Spanish club UCAM Murcia of the Liga ACB.

NBA draft rights
Lishchuk was selected by the NBA's Memphis Grizzlies in the 2004 NBA Draft. On February 21, 2008, his NBA draft rights were traded to the Houston Rockets, in exchange for the draft rights to Malick Badiane.

On December 15, 2010 Lishchuk's draft rights were traded to Los Angeles Lakers, in a three-way trade with the New Jersey Nets. On July 13, 2014, Lishchuk's draft rights were traded back to the Rockets, from the Lakers, in exchange for Jeremy Lin and two 2015 NBA draft picks.

On December 19, 2014, the Rockets traded Lishchuk's draft rights to the Philadelphia 76ers, in a three-team trade that sent Corey Brewer to the Houston Rockets. On January 7, 2015, his draft rights were traded to the Los Angeles Clippers for Jared Cunningham, the draft rights to Cenk Akyol, and cash.

On January 22, 2016, Lishchuk's draft rights were traded back to the Houston Rockets, along with Josh Smith and cash considerations, in exchange for the draft rights to Maarty Leunen.

Ukrainian national team
Lishchuk has been a member of the senior men's Ukrainian national basketball team. With his senior national team, he played at the EuroBasket 2001, the EuroBasket 2005, and the EuroBasket 2011.

Career statistics

EuroLeague

|-
| style="text-align:left;"| 2010–11
| style="text-align:left;"| Valencia
| 21 || 3 || 16.2 || .443 || .333 || .536 || 4.9 || .4 || .3 || .9 || 6.3 || 6.9
|-
| style="text-align:left;"| 2014–15
| style="text-align:left;"| Valencia
| 6 || 3 || 12.2 || .333 || .000 || .667 || 2.5 || .2 || .2 || .2 || 3.0 || .8
|- class="sortbottom"
| style="text-align:center;" colspan=2| Career
| 27 || 6 || 15.3 || .419 || .333 || .565 || 4.4 || .4 || .3 || .7 || 5.6 || 5.5

References

External links

 Serhiy Lishchuk at acb.com 
 Serhiy Lishchuk  at eurobasket.com
 Serhiy Lishchuk at euroleague.net
 Serhiy Lishchuk at draftexpress.com
 Serhiy Lishchuk at fiba.com (archive)
 Serhiy Lishchuk at nba.com

1982 births
Living people
BC Azovmash players
BC Khimik players
CB Murcia players
Centers (basketball)
Liga ACB players
Memphis Grizzlies draft picks
Sportspeople from Rivne
Power forwards (basketball)
Ukrainian expatriate basketball people in Spain
Ukrainian men's basketball players
Valencia Basket players